Hermann Wiggers (7 April 1880 – 1968) was a German international footballer.

References

1880 births
1968 deaths
German footballers
Association football defenders
Germany international footballers
SC Victoria Hamburg players